Haweswater is a reservoir in the valley of Mardale, Cumbria in the Lake District, England. Work to raise the height of the original natural lake was started in 1929. It was controversially dammed after the UK Parliament passed a Private Act giving Manchester Corporation permission to build the reservoir to supply drinking water to the city. The decision caused a public outcry because the farming villages of Measand and Mardale Green would be flooded and the valley altered forever.

The reservoir is now owned by United Utilities. It supplies about 25% of the North West's water supply.

Etymology
Haweswater is derived from Old Norse or Old English. 'Hafr's lake' refers to the personal Norse name 'Hafr' or in Old English 'Hæfer'; 'water' or 'wæter' is the dominant term for 'lake' in old English.

Geology 
Haweswater is the location of a caldera volcano succession.

History

A tongue of land at Measand divided the lake almost in two. The upper and lower reaches of the lake were known as High Water and Low Water.

In 1929 work started to build the dam wall across the valley floor. At the time of construction, its design was considered to be at the forefront of civil engineering technology because it was the world's first hollow buttress dam. The wall would be created from 44 separate buttressed units joined by flexible joints. Building supplies were brought to the site from the adjoining valleys of Heltondale and Swindale.

Before the valley was flooded in 1935, all the farms and dwellings of the villages of Mardale Green and Measand were demolished, as well as the centuries-old Dun Bull Inn at Mardale Green. The village church was dismantled and the stone used in constructing the dam; all the bodies in the churchyard were exhumed and re-buried at Shap.

Today, when the water in the reservoir is low, the remains of the submerged village of Mardale Green can still be seen, including stone walls and the village bridge.

Manchester Corporation built a new road along the eastern side of the lake to replace the flooded highway lower in the valley, and the Haweswater Hotel was constructed midway down the length of the reservoir as a replacement for the Dun Bull. The road continues to the western end of Haweswater, to a car park, a popular starting point for a path to the surrounding fells of Harter Fell, Branstree and High Street.

Wildlife

Fish
There is a population of schelly fish in the lake, believed to have lived there since the last Ice Age.

RSPB Haweswater
The Royal Society for the Protection of Birds (RSPB) first became involved in Haweswater because of the presence of golden eagles.
The organisation currently manages two farms in the area.

Until 2015 Haweswater was the only place in England where a golden eagle was resident. A pair of eagles first nested in the valley of Riggindale in 1969, and the male and female of the pairing changed several times over the years, during which sixteen chicks were produced. The female bird disappeared in April 2004, leaving the male alone.
There was an RSPB observation post in the valley for people wishing to see the eagle: the last sighting was in November 2015. It was reported that the 20-year old bird may have died of natural causes.

In 2012 the RSPB leased two farms from the landowner United Utilities. The aim is to combine the improvement of wildlife habitats and water quality with running a viable sheep farm. Moorland and woodland habitats are being improved for birds as well as the rare small mountain ringlet butterfly. Measures include grip blocking, heather replanting, juniper woodland planting (especially in the ghylls).

Literary references
Lake District writer and fell walker Alfred Wainwright had this to say on the construction of the Haweswater Dam in his 1955 book A Pictorial Guide to the Lakeland Fells:

Haweswater is a 2002 novel by British writer Sarah Hall, set in Mardale at the time of the building of the dam and flooding of the valley. It won the 2003 Commonwealth Writers' Prize for a First book. The novel was released in the United States as a paperback original in October 2006, by Harper Perennial.

Hawes Water is described in Anthony Trollope's novel Can You Forgive Her? (1864).

References

External links

 Lake District Walks – Haweswater 
 United Utilities – Haweswater Estate
 RSPB Haweswater

Reservoirs in Cumbria
Drinking water reservoirs in England
Westmorland
RHaweswater
Eden District
Bampton, Cumbria
Calderas of England